Chatsworth is an unincorporated community located within Woodland Township in Burlington County, New Jersey, United States. The area is served as United States Postal Service ZIP Code 08019. The New Jersey Central's Blue Comet passenger train was wrecked here in 1939. Chatsworth has been called "Capital of the Pine Barrens."

As of the 2000 United States Census, the population for ZIP Code Tabulation Area 08019 was 883.

Climate

The climate in this area is characterized by hot, humid summers and generally mild to cool winters. According to the Köppen Climate Classification system, Chatsworth has a humid subtropical climate, abbreviated "Cfa" on climate maps.

References

External links

Census 2000 Fact Sheet for Zip Code Tabulation Area 08019 from the United States Census Bureau

Woodland Township, New Jersey
Populated places in the Pine Barrens (New Jersey)
Unincorporated communities in Burlington County, New Jersey
Unincorporated communities in New Jersey